DWDB-TV (channel 27) is a television station in Metro Manila, Philippines, serving as the flagship of the GTV network. It is owned and operated by GMA Network, Inc. alongside GMA flagship DZBB-TV (channel 7). Both stations share studios at the GMA Network Center, EDSA corner Timog Avenue, Diliman, Quezon City, while DWDB-TV's hybrid analog and digital transmitting facility is located at the GMA Tower of Power, Tandang Sora Avenue, Barangay Culiat, Quezon City (sharing facilities with sister stations GMA 7 and Barangay LS 97.1).

History

Citynet Television (1995–1999) 

DWDB-TV signed on for the first time on August 27, 1995, under the on-air brand Citynet Television 27 (or just Citynet 27). The station was programmed like an independent stationGMA intended Citynet 27 to be its main outlet for imported programming (particularly from the United States), freeing up slots in GMA Network's schedule for more domestic productions.  Aside from an English dub of the Hispanic telenovela Ka Ina (produced and broadcast by Venezuelan TV network Venevisión), the only locally produced program on the station was Citynet Television News, a flagship TV news show produced by GMA News and Public Affairs.

EMC 27 / Channel [V] Philippines (1999–2001) 
However, by 1999, the costs of operating the station in this format were becoming too high for GMA as well as the intense competition from Studio 23 (later renamed as ABS-CBN Sports and Action in 2014), a UHF television network owned by AMCARA Broadcasting Network and operated by ABS-CBN Corporation. As a result, DWDB was turned into a music channel under the interim branding EMC, the Entertainment Music Channelwhich was also the country's first locally operated music channel. A few months later, GMA reached a deal with Asian broadcaster STAR TV to allow DWDB to be a carrier of Channel V Philippines, which took effect December 19, 1999. GMA had already aired selected Channel V programming from its international version (which made the former VJ's and Filipino descented Trey Farley and Joey Mead familiar to viewers of DWDB). This arrangement did not last longa stake in GMA was recently purchased by the Philippine Long Distance Telephone Company, who already owned MTV Philippines through the Nation Broadcasting Corporation and its parent company MediaQuest Holdings. This conflict of interest, along with the increasing competition from the MTV affiliated network, led to the channel signing-off on July 25, 2001.

QTV 
Programming would return to DWDB in 2004 as the relay of GMA-7 Manila with the logo of GMA was covered by the logo of Citynet. In November 2005, the station became a repeater of DZOE 11, which served as the flagship for GMA's newly-secondary national network QTV (or Quality Television, later renamed to just Q). GMA had reached an agreement with its owner ZOE Broadcasting Network to allow GMA to handle programming for the station in exchange for providing upgraded facilities for the broadcaster and airing ZOE-produced programming in QTV's lineup. DWDB's UHF signal had the advantage of easier to receive in the southern areas of Metro Manila, especially in the metropolitan cities of Makati and Pasay.

This practice was discontinued in 2007, as DWDB's channel number was vacated for use in trials of digital television.

Digital broadcast 

In February 2013, GMA started its digital test broadcasts, simulcasting both GMA-7 and GMA News TV-11 using the Japanese ISDB-T digital TV platform using the channel's frequency.

On May 15, 2019, GMA Network's digital test broadcasts used the same frequency as its digital feed, and it also started its initial digital test broadcast on UHF Channel 15 (479.143 MHz), which served as the main digital feed of GMA Network when this frequency reverted to analog broadcast, and continued its service for the remainder of the analog feed.

Reversion to analog broadcast; GMA News TV (2019–2021) 

On April 24, 2019, ZOE Broadcasting Network and GMA/Citynet announced that their blocktime agreement would expire by the end of May 2019. This ended their day partnership and in turn, their blocktime lease on VHF Channel 11 after 14 years. ZOE Broadcasting Network was reported to simulcast Light TV 33 upon termination of the agreement, but ZOE had no official statement yet on its future plans, however the network became active again on June 22, 2020, after making a deal with new blocktime partner and erstwhile rival network ABS-CBN to open A2Z Channel 11. As a result, Channel 27 digital broadcast was planned to switch off on May 27, 2019, as the station was supposedly conducting its test broadcast on the said date. The channel in turn, was to be re-utilized to broadcast GMA News TV in analog by June 3, 2019, after 18 years of inactivity.

However, GMA Network had to allot time for the digital television viewers to re-scan their digital boxes in order to continue watching their channels in a different frequency assignment. As a result of this, GMA Network decided to move their official relaunch date from June 3 to 4. The station successfully signed on for the first time upon its return to analog television at 6:00 a.m. PHT, after conducting test broadcasts during off-air hours of digital signal for the past days after its announcement of this move, and it now served as the originating station of GMA News TV in Manila. It also acts as the main feed station nationwide with its regional counterparts (like in Cebu and Davao). On the other hand, after the transition, the former channel, missed the said shut-off, resulting to a broadcast conflict of the two channels that day. However they lowered their signal, until it officially signed off on June 5, 2019.

GTV (2021–present) 
After 20 months since its separation with ZOE TV Channel 11 (its originating channel assignment since 2011) and after nearly 10 years on the air, GMA News TV was officially relaunched as GTV as a news, entertainment, and sports channel, similar to the format of Citynet Television and Q, but retaining some of news programming from the previous channel branding.

The newly-branded station signed-on for the first time on February 22, 2021, using the GMA News TV sign-on and sign-off notices. GTV began using its own sign-on and sign-off notices on February 27, 2021.

Digital television

Digital channels

DWDB-TV's feed is broadcast on DZBB-TV digital subchannel operates on UHF channel 15 (479.143 MHz) and broadcasts on the following subchannels:

According to a December 2017 press release, the station's upgraded signal transmission covered the areas of Metro Manila, Rizal, Cavite, Laguna, Bulacan and parts of Pampanga, Bataan, Nueva Ecija, and Batangas.

On April 24, 2019, GMA/Citynet announced that it would terminate its blocktime agreement with ZOE Broadcasting Network by the end of May 2019. Third-party sources reported that Channel 11 would simulcast ZOE's sister station DZOZ-DTV channel 33 after the termination of the agreement, but ZOE had no official statement yet on its future plans. GNTV Manila's intellectual unit (master control, sales, and employees), on the other hand, was successfully transferred to DWDB-TV on June 4, 2019, for the remainder of the analog broadcast run.

On May 15, 2019, GMA Network began to transmit its digital test broadcast on UHF Channel 15 (479.143 MHz) as its permanent frequency assigned by National Telecommunications Commission.

See also 
 GMA Network
 DZBB-TV
 QTV / Q
 GMA News TV
 GTV
 List of GTV stations

References

External links 
 PhilMusic News: Channel V Philippines bids goodbye

GTV (Philippine TV network) stations
Television stations in Metro Manila
Television channels and stations established in 1995